The Hong Kong Islamic Youth Association (HKIYA) is an Islamic association for youths in Hong Kong. The organisation is based at the Ammar Mosque and Osman Ramju Sadick Islamic Centre.

History
The HKIYA was founded in 1973 in British Hong Kong. On 26 May 1999, the association was incorporated as a Limited Company by Guarantee under the Companies Ordinance.

Organisational structure
 Chairman
 Vice-Chairman
 Internal Secretary
 External Secretary
 Treasurer
 Public Relation Officer
 Welfare Officer
 Publication Officer
 Cultural and Educational Officer
 Recreational Officer
 Quarter Master

See also
 Islam in China
 Islam in Hong Kong

References

External links
 

1973 establishments in Hong Kong
Islamic youth organizations
Islamic organizations established in 1973
Islamic organisations based in Hong Kong
Youth organizations established in 1973
Youth organisations based in Hong Kong